Trupanea californica is a species of tephritid or fruit flies in the genus Trupanea of the family Tephritidae.

Distribution
United States & Canada.

References

Tephritinae
Insects described in 1942
Diptera of North America
Taxa named by John Russell Malloch